Quality Over Opinion is the sixth solo album and fourth studio album by American musician Louis Cole. It was released on October 14, 2022 on Brainfeeder.

Background and release 
Quality Over Opinion was Cole's second album released through Brainfeeder, after 2018's Time. The album was recorded and produced in Cole's home studio, with Cole performing most of the instruments himself. According to Cole, inspirations for the album included Gustav Mahler, György Ligeti, Miles Davis, Meshuggah, Morten Lauridsen, and Super Mario Kart.

Cole released four singles in the months leading up to the album's release: "Let it Happen", "I'm Tight", "Not Needed Anymore", and "Dead Inside Shuffle". Cole  filmed music videos for all four of these, as well as for "Park Your Car on My Face" and "Shallow Laughter / Bitches". He also released a full-album lyric video of himself lip syncing along in a bathroom mirror. In an article for NPR, Nate Chinen noted Cole's "deadpan dance" moves and absurdist humor in the video for "I'm Tight".

Reception 
Quality Over Opinion was met with positive reviews, with Chinen describing the album as "bracing" and Ammar Kalia of The Guardian calling it Cole's "most accomplished and well-rounded work to date". Michael Major of BroadwayWorld described "I'm Tight" as "a sleek, laser-focused Funk rocket, based on an utterly irresistible bassline."

The song "Let it Happen" was nominated for the Grammy Award for Best Arrangement, Instrumental and Vocals.

Track listing

References 

2022 albums
Brainfeeder albums